William Douglas Telfer (26 October 1925 – 11 November 1995) was a Scottish football player and manager. He played as a centre half for St Mirren, Rangers, Queen of the South and Hamilton Academical.

He represented Scotland once, in a 1954 British Home Championship match against Wales, and made four appearances for the Scottish Football League XI.

Telfer later managed Albion Rovers from 1962 until 1965.

References

External links
 
 

1925 births
Association football defenders
Scottish footballers
Scotland international footballers
Burnbank Athletic F.C. players
Scottish Junior Football Association players
St Mirren F.C. players
Rangers F.C. players
Queen of the South F.C. players
Sportspeople from Larkhall
Hamilton Academical F.C. players
Scottish football managers
Albion Rovers F.C. managers
1995 deaths
Scottish Football League representative players
Footballers from South Lanarkshire
Scottish Football League managers
Place of death missing